Štikada is a village in the Lika-Senj County, Croatia. The settlement is administered as a part of Lovinac municipality.

Location
It is located in Lika, 5 kilometers from Gračac, on the state road D50.

Population
According to national census of 2011, population of the settlement is 216. The majority of the population are Serbs.

See also
 Church of Saint Apostles Peter and Paul, Štikada

References

External links
  

Populated places in Lika-Senj County